Walter Anthony Sessi (July 23, 1918 – April 18, 1998), nicknamed "Watsie", was an American Major League Baseball outfielder and pinch hitter who appeared in 20 total MLB games for the St. Louis Cardinals in  and .

Sessi's professional baseball career began in 1937 in the minor leagues and was interrupted by his four years of service (1942–1945) in the United States Army during World War II. During his 14-season minor league career, which ended in 1955, he was known as a power hitter, blasting more than 20 home runs six times, capped by a 45-homer season in 1952 in the Class B Gulf States League.

As a big-leaguer, Sessi compiled two hits and two bases on balls in 29 plate appearances. One of his hits was a ninth-inning, walk-off home run on August 28, 1946, against the New York Giants' Bill Voiselle at Sportsman's Park, which carried the Cardinals to a 3–2 victory. Every win was important for the 1946 Redbirds, who would finish the regular season in a tie with the Brooklyn Dodgers for the pennant, sweep the 1946 National League tie-breaker series, and defeat the Boston Red Sox for the world championship.

References

External links

1918 births
1998 deaths
Abilene Blue Sox players
Baseball players from Pennsylvania
Brownsville Charros players
Columbus Red Birds players
Fort Worth Cats players
Houston Buffaloes players
Kinston Eagles players
Lake Charles Lakers players
Major League Baseball outfielders
Mobile Bears players
Mobile Shippers players
Montreal Royals players
People from Washington County, Pennsylvania
St. Louis Cardinals players
Shelby Cardinals players
Thomasville Chair Makers players
United States Army personnel of World War II
Williamson Colts players
Williamson Red Birds players